Parastrachia japonensis is a species of true bugs belonging to the family Parastrachiidae. It is one of the two species in the genus, both from Eastern Asia.

Caenorhabditis japonica is a species of nematodes found in the wild non-parasitically associated with P. japonensis.

References

External links 

 

Shield bugs
Fauna of East Asia
Insects described in 1880